Symphony No. 4, "A Vitória" (Victory) is a composition by the Brazilian composer Heitor Villa-Lobos, written in 1919. A recording conducted by the composer lasts just over thirty minutes.

History
This symphony is subtitled A Vitória (Victory), while its predecessor and successor are subtitled A Guerra (War) and A Paix (Peace), respectively. It is also the fourth in a cycle of five symphonies in the style of Vincent d'Indy. It was first performed at the Theatro Municipal in Rio de Janeiro, together with the Third Symphony, in September 1920 by the Orchestra do Theatro Municipal conducted by the composer. From 10 to 13 June 1955 Villa-Lobos made a recording of this symphony at the Salle de la Mutualité in Paris with the Orchestre National de la Radiodiffusion Française.

Instrumentation
The symphony is scored for a large orchestra and brass band. The orchestra consists of: 2 piccolos, 3 flutes, 2 oboes, cor anglais, 2 clarinets, bass clarinet, soprano saxophone, alto saxophone, tenor saxophone, baritone saxophone, 3 bassoons, contrabassoon, 4 horns, 4 trumpets, 4 trombones, tuba, timpani, cymbals, bass drum, drum, side drum, tam-tam, bells, sistrum, small frame drum, chocalho, sleigh bells, triangle, xylophone, celesta, 2 harps, piano, and strings. The wind band consists of: E clarinet, soprano saxophone, alto saxophone, euphonium, cornets, bugles, horn, 1 or more saxhorns, bass trombone, contrabass trombone in E, contrabass trombone in B, bass drum. There is also a concertino ensemble made up of E clarinet, soprano, alto, and tenor saxophones, euphonium, small frame drum, triangle, cymbals, and bass drum.

Analysis
The work is in four movements:
 Allegro impectuoso 
 Andantino
 Andante
 Lento – Allegro

The Fourth Symphony employs the principle of cyclic form. The main theme of the first movement recurs in all of the following movements, with the aim of providing unity to the whole work. Moreover, themes from Villa-Lobos's Third Symphony are also quoted here, which has sometimes incorrectly been assumed to imply that these two symphonies were originally a single work.

References

Cited sources

Further reading
 Béhague, Gerard. 1994. Villa-Lobos: The Search for Brazil's Musical Soul. Austin: Institute of Latin American Studies, University of Texas at Austin, 1994. .
 Salles, Paulo de Tarso. 2009. Villa-Lobos: processos composicionais. Campinas, SP: Editora da Unicamp. .

 

Symphonies by Heitor Villa-Lobos
1919 compositions